Żelkowo is a non-operational PKP railway station in Żelkowo (Pomeranian Voivodeship), Poland.

Lines crossing the station

References 
Żelkowo article at Polish Stations Database, URL accessed at 21 March 2006

Railway stations in Pomeranian Voivodeship
Disused railway stations in Pomeranian Voivodeship
Słupsk County